PRS or prs may refer to:

Science and technology
 Peripheral Reflex System, an implementation of autonomous peripheral operations in microcontrollers
 Personal response system, in audience response
 Phenotypic response surfaces, in medicine
 Pierre Robin syndrome, a congenital condition of facial abnormalities
 Polygenic risk score, in genetics
 Present tense, in linguistics
 Procedural reasoning system, for developing intelligent agents
 Products Requirement Specification, another term for the Product Requirements Document

Places
 Prees railway station (National Rail station code), England
 Pacific Ridge School, California, US

Organisations
 PRS for Music (formerly the Performing Right Society), UK copyright collective
 PRS Legislative Research, parliamentary service in New Delhi, India
 PRS Guitars, the guitar brand of luthier Paul Reed Smith
 Polish Register of Shipping, a classification society
 Pilots Right Stuff, former German paraglider manufacturer

Political
 Party for Social Renewal, Guinea-Bissau
 Radical Socialist Republican Party, Spain

Other uses
 Precision Rifle Series, shooting sport
 President of the Royal Society of London
 Poverty Reduction Strategy, required by the IMF and World Bank
 Dari (Persian dialect) of Afghanistan, ISO code
 Phocaean red slip, Late Roman and Early Byzantine pottery

See also
 PR (disambiguation)
 PR5 (disambiguation)
 PRSS (disambiguation)